is a Japanese manga series written and illustrated by Norifusa Mita. Serialized in Weekly Morning from 2003 to 2007, it was released into 21 tankōbon by Kodansha between October 22, 2003, and August 23, 2007. It was adapted into live action television series of the same name broadcast on TBS in 2005.

A sequel titled  was published in the same magazine between 2007 and 2010. It was compiled into 14 tankōbon released by Kodansha between January 23, 2008, and August 23, 2010.

Another sequel manga titled Dragon Zakura Two was serialized in Weekly Morning from January 2018 to March 2021.

Plot 

This is a story about a private high school (Ryuzan) in which lawyer Kenji Sakuragi, a former biker, is sent to close down. His business is on the rocks due to his biker background being made public in a scandal-magazine. Sakuragi gets the idea of turning the school around instead of closing it, thereby resurrecting his career. He goes for an outrageous goal: getting 5 students from this no-hope highschool into Tokyo University, the top university in the country. He persuades the director to back him, then gives a rousing speech to the entire school to announce the special class. "You're all losers and you'll stay losers for the rest of your lives! Because you're too lazy to use your brains and you haven't figured out that society is run by clever folks who make sure they always win and you always lose. If you don't like that prospect, study! I'll give you a goal: get into Tokyo University!" he shouts to a stunned, silent crowd.

When none of the existing teachers have the backbone to take on the responsibility for this class, Sakuragi decides to run the class himself. To help him, he obtains the assistance of a motley crew of unorthodox teachers to teach math, language arts, social studies, and English. Using a combination of tough love and unusual scientific methods, he goads, bribes, and cajoles 2 students into joining the class. He's assisted but also opposed by a couple of young English teachers, one of whom hates him and is always suspicious of his motives and methods. Will Sakuragi succeed or will the cynicism of just about everyone else win out? And just how does Sakuragi know so much about how to get into Tokyo University, anyway?

In addition to offering many scientific methods for studying for tests generally and preparing for Tokyo University, in particular, the series includes many interesting insights and points of view about human psychology.

Reception
The manga has sold over 6 million copies, and won the 2005 Kodansha Manga Award for general manga. It also won an Excellence Prize at the 2005 Japan Media Arts Festival, with the jury saying, "The theme is not new, the composition is somewhat orthodox and it is true that there was criticism of the drawing skill. However, the story is told with such great conviction and pathos that these weaknesses are easily overlooked. It is a very entertaining manga, which is probably the most important thing."

Adaptations
The manga has been adapted into a Japanese television drama series of the same name and also into a 2010 South Korean television drama series titled Master of Study. It will also be adapted into a Chinese internet television drama series.

On 10 March 2020, it was announced that a live action series is planned based on the series' sequel and will air on TBS. Actor Hiroshi Abe is reprising his role as Kenji Sakuragi from the previous live-action adaptations. The story is to be set 10 years after the previous series. It was originally slated for summer 2020, but has been delayed due to the COVID-19 pandemic.

References

External links 

Dragon Zakura
2003 manga
2007 comics endings
Examinations and testing in fiction
Kodansha manga
Manga adapted into television series
Seinen manga
Teaching anime and manga
Winner of Kodansha Manga Award (General)